Parakkum Pavai is a 1966 Indian Tamil-language drama film, directed by T. R. Ramanna, starring M. G. Ramachandran and B. Saroja Devi. The film was released on 11 November 1966 and averagely grossed, having run in theatres for 80 days.

Plot 

Jeeva, the son of a businessman, promises a dying man Vedhachalam, that he will take care of his daughter Kala. To do so, he obtains employment as a trapeze artist in the National Circus.

Cast 
 M. G. Ramachandran as Jeeva
 B. Saroja Devi as Kala
 J. P. Chandrababu as Rubber
 R. S. Manohar as Kabali
 K. A. Thangavelu as The director of The National Circus
 S. V. Ramadas as Veeramuthu
 V. Nagayya as Vedhachalam
 O. A. K. Thevar as Balasubramaniyam
 M. N. Nambiar as Rangasamy
 S. A. Ashokan as Vijayan
 N. S. Natarajan as Dhandapani
 Sadan as the leader of the group of the men in "Nilavenna Aadi"
 Rajasulochana as Sarasu
 Kanchana as Shantha
 G. Sakunthala as Kannamma
 S. D. Subbulakshmi as Amaniyamma
 Manorama as Dilruba
 Madhavi as Rita

Production 
Parakkum Paavai was produced and directed by T. R. Ramanna under R. R. Pictures, and written by Sakthi T. K. Krishnasamy. Cinematography was handled by M. A. Rehman. The film was prominently shot in an actual circus location.

Soundtrack 
The music was composed by M. S. Viswanathan, with lyrics by Kannadasan.

Release and reception 
Parakkum Pavai was released on 11 November 1966. The Indian Express wrote, "Spectacular thrills, spills, breathtaking serial feats and a dazzling display of acrobatics highlight R. R. Pictures Parakkum Pavai [...] a social drama set against an exciting panorama of circus life." Kalki also lauded the film for the circus scenes. Despite this, according to historian Randor Guy, the film was not a major success as it ran for only 80 days in theatres.

References

External links 
 

1960s Tamil-language films
1966 drama films
1966 films
Circus films
Films directed by T. R. Ramanna
Films scored by M. S. Viswanathan
Indian drama films